23 Solo Pieces for La Naissance de L'Amour is the soundtrack album by Welsh multi-instrumentalist and composer John Cale. It was released in November 1993 on Belgian independent label Les Disques du Crépuscule. It was produced by Cale's then collaborator Jean-Michel Reusser. It is the original music score for Philippe Garrel's film La Naissance de l'amour.

Track listing 
All tracks composed by John Cale.
"La Naissance De L'Amour I" − 0:53
"If You Love Me No More…" − 0:52
"And If I Love You Still…" − 2:39
"Judith" − 2:34
"Converging Themes" − 1:54
"Opposites Attract" − 3:30
"I Will Do It, I Will Do It" − 0:30
"Keep It To Yourself" − 3:04
"Walk Towards the Sea" − 1:24
"Unquiet Heart" − 3:57
"Waking Up to Love" − 0:43
"Mysterious Relief" − 1:25
"Never Been So Happy (… In Lonely Streets)" − 1:52
"Beyond Expectations" − 2:52
"Conversation in the Garden" − 1:27
"La Naissance De L'Amour II" − 0:46
"Secret Dialogue" − 2:34
"Roma" − 2:46
"On the Dark Side" − 3:25
"La Naissance De L'Amour III" − 0:58
"Eye to Eye" − 1:03
"Marie's Car Crash & Hotel Rooms" − 1:44
"La Naissance De L'Amour IV" − 0:58

Personnel
 John Cale − piano

Credits

 Edited By, Mastered By [Pre-mastering], Other [Treatments] – Charles Van der Elst aka Charlie VDE
 Mastered By – Jean-Pierre Bouquet, Jean-Pierre Chalbos
 Performer, Written-By – John Cale
 Producer – Jean-Michel Reusser
 Recorded By [Assistant - Grand Piano Recordings] – Olivier Dohuu
 Recorded By [Grand Piano Recordings] – Daniel Deshays

References

John Cale soundtracks
1993 soundtrack albums
Albums produced by John Cale